Ausflag is an organisation that was established to promote a new flag of Australia.

Ausflag was formed in 1981 by Harold Scruby who has since worked to foster debate on the design of the flag. Prominent Australians that have been involved in the direction of Ausflag include Nicholas Whitlam, Phillip Adams, Cathy Freeman, Malcolm Turnbull, Janet Holmes à Court and Nick Greiner. Former chair of the Australian Republican Movement Malcolm Turnbull left the board of Ausflag in 1994 after being asked for his resignation and in 2004 joined the Australian National Flag Association.

The group was affiliated with NZFlag, a now defunct trust promoting a redesign of the Flag of New Zealand.

Campaigns
Ausflag has promoted design competitions for a new flag in 1986 before the bicentenary, in 1993 after Sydney won the right to host the 2000 Olympics, and in 1998, before the new millennium.

In January 2011 the organisation drafted a statement in support of a new flag, which has been signed by over a dozen Australian of the Year recipients, including Patrick McGorry, Ian Kiernan, Dawn Fraser, Shane Gould, Ian Frazer, Gustav Nossal and Tim Flannery.

On Australia Day 2013, Ausflag launched a seventh flag design, a concept for an Australian Sporting Flag. To date none of the flag designs promoted by the organisation has achieved customary use.

See also

Australian National Flag Association
Australian flag debate
Australian Republic Movement

References

External links
Ausflag
Ausflag Competition Results

Non-profit organisations based in New South Wales
Organizations established in 1981
1981 establishments in Australia
Vexillology
Republicanism in Australia
Political organisations based in Australia